The following is an alphabetical list of articles related to the U.S. state of Oregon.

The list serves as a navigation index to Oregon-related topics as a companion to :Category:Oregon. Topics listed as "category" link to category pages where one can browse all articles marked with that category. Topics listed as "commons category" link to Wikimedia Commons pages containing images and other media files relating to that topic. Topics listed as "subsection" link to a subsection of a main article. All other topics link to articles or lists directly relating to the topic.

A

Agencies, state
Agriculture
Agriculture (category)
Agriculture (commons category)
Airports
Airports, private-use
Alcohol
Amphibians and reptiles of Oregon
Amusement parks (category)
Aquaria (category)
Arboreta (category)
Arches, natural (category)
Archaeology
Archaeological sites (category)
Architecture (see Buildings and structures)
Art museums and galleries (category)
Astronomical observatories (category)
Attorney General, Oregon

B
Ballot measures
Beaches
Beaches (category)
Beaches (commons category)
Beer
Breweries (category)
Bird, state
Birds
Bridges (category)
Bridges, covered
Buildings and structures (category)

C

Cannabis
Canyons and gorges (category)
Capital, State
Salem 1859–
Capital, Territorial
Corvallis, 1855
Oregon City, 1848–1851
Salem, 1851–1855 and 1855–1859
Capitol Building
Capitol Building (commons category)
Casinos (category)
Caves (category)
Census statistical areas
Christianity (category)
Cities
Cities (commons category)
Civil War units, Oregon
Climate (subsection)
Colleges and universities
Colleges and Universities (commons category)
Colleges, community
Communications (category)
Communities, unincorporated
Community colleges
Companies (category)
Congressional districts
Congressional delegations
Constitution

Controlled substances
Convention centers (category)
Counties
Counties (commons category)
County name etymologies
Court, United States District
Court of Appeals, Ninth Circuit
Cuisine
Culture
Culture (category)

D
Dams and reservoirs
Demographics
District Court, United States
Drugs (see Controlled substances)

E
Economy
Economy (category)
Economy (commons category)
Education (subsection)
Education (category)
Elections
Elections (commons category)
Environment (category)
Etymology, state name
Etymologies, county names
Executions
Executive branch, State of Oregon (subsection)

F

Festivals (category)
Flag
Flower, State
Forts
Forts (category)
Forts (commons category)
Forests (category)
Forests, National (category)
Forests, State

G
Galleries and art museums (category)
Gardens (category)
Gardens, botanical (category)
Geography
Geography (category)
Geography (commons category)
Geology
Geology (category)
Ghost towns
Ghost towns (category)
Glaciers (category)
GLOBIO
Golf clubs and courses (category)
Government, State
Government (category)
Government (commons category)
Government, Provisional
Government, Territorial
Legislature, Territorial
Legislators, Territorial
Officials, Territorial (category)
Governor
Governors, list of

H
Heritage railroads (category)
High schools
Higher education
Highways, state
Highways, state (category)
Highways, named state
Highway route numbers
Hiking trails (category)
Historic Landmarks, National
Historic places, registered
Historic places, registered (category)
History
Historical outline
History (category)
History (commons category)
History, indigenous peoples (subsection)
History, pioneer
Hospitals
Hospitals (category)
Hot springs (category)
House of Representatives

I
Images (category)
Images (commons category)
Indian reservations
Indian wars
Nez Perce War
Islands
Islands (category)

J
Jails
Judges
Judges, Oregon State (category)
Judges, Oregon Supreme Court (category)
Judges, Territorial (category)
Judicial branch, Government of Oregon

L

Lakes
Lakes (category)
Lakes (commons category)
Landmarks (category)
Law (category)
Law enforcement agencies
Legislative branch, Government of Oregon
Legislature, State
Lighthouses (category)
Lighthouses, Oregon Coast
Lists

M
Maps (category)
Maps (commons category)
Mass media (category)
Methamphetamine (section)
Monuments and memorials (category)
Mountains
Mountains (category)
Mountains (commons category)
Mountain ranges
Mountain ranges (category)
Museums
Museums (category)
Museums (commons category)
Music
Musical groups (category)
Musicians (category)

N
National Forests (category)
National Forests (commons category)
National Monuments (category)
Native American tribes
Native American tribes (category)
Native American tribal entities
Native plants
Natural gas pipelines (category)
Natural history
Natural history (category)
Newspapers

O
Observatories, astronomical (category)
Oregon
Oregon (category)
Oregon (commons category)
Oregon Ballot Measures 68 and 69 (2010)
Oregon boundary dispute, 1844–1846
Oregon Country, 1818–1846
Oregon Racquetball
Oregon Society of Certified Public Accountants
Oregon State Capitol
Oregon State Leather Contest
Oregon Territory, 1848–1859
Oregon Trail
Outdoor sculptures (category)

P
Pacific Northwest Waterways Association
Parks (category)
State parks
State parks (category)
People
People (category)
People (commons category)
People by city
People by county
People by occupation
Plants, native
Politics
Politics (category)
Political parties
Populated places (category)
Census-designated places (category)
Cities (category)
Unincorporated communities (category)
Villages (category)
Power stations
Prisons
Protected areas (category)
Provisional Government, 1843–1848

R
Radio stations
Railroad museums (category)
Railroads
Registered historic places
Registered historic places (commons category)
Religion
Religion (category)
Representatives, State
Representatives, United States
Rivers
Rivers (category)
Rivers (commons category)
Rock formations (category)

S

Scenic highways (category)
Schools
Boarding schools (category)
Elementary (category)
High schools
High schools (category)
Middle schools (category)
Private schools (category)
School districts
School districts (category)
Scouting
Seal, Oregon State
Secretary of State, Oregon
Senate, Oregon State
Senators, United States
Settlements (see Populated places)
Ghost towns (category)
Sister states (subsection)
Ski areas and resorts (category)
Solar power
Sports
Sports (category)
Sports (commons category)
Sports venues (category)
State Capitol, Oregon
State Highways
Supreme Court, Oregon
State forests
State parks
State parks (category)
State parks (commons category)
State prisons
Structures (category)
Structures (commons category)
Supreme Court, Oregon
Symbols
Symbols (commons category)

T
Television shows set in Oregon (category)
Television stations
Territory, Oregon
Theatres (category)
Tourism (category)
Transportation
Transportation (subsection)
Transportation (category)
Transportation (commons category)
Treasurer, Oregon State
Treaties
Adams-Onís Treaty
Anglo-American Convention of 1818
Oregon Treaty
Tree, state

U
Universities
Universities and colleges (commons category)

V
Vineyards and wineries
Volcanoes (category)

W
Waterfalls (category)
Waterfalls (commons category)
Wine
Wineries and vineyards
Writers (category)
Wind power

X

Y

Z
Zoos (category)
Zoos (commons category)

See also

Topic overview:
Oregon
Outline of Oregon

 

Oregon
 
Oregon